Reducing is a 1931 American Pre-Code comedy film directed by Charles Reisner and written by Beatrice Banyard, Robert E. Hopkins, Willard Mack and Zelda Sears. The film stars Marie Dressler, Polly Moran, Anita Page, Lucien Littlefield, William Collier, Jr. and Sally Eilers. The film was released on January 3, 1931, by Metro-Goldwyn-Mayer.

Plot
The snobbish Madame Pauline "Polly" Rochay operates an exclusive beauty parlor in New York City that specializes in weight reduction. When she learns that her sister, Marie Truffle, is destitute, Polly decides to take her, her husband Elmer and their three children, Vivian, Jerry and Marty, from South Bend, Indiana, into her home. Joyce, Polly's socialite daughter, objects to her mother's decision, insisting that the Truffles are too unrefined to live among the Rochays. When the Truffles finally arrive in the big city, Polly puts her sister to work at her salon while Elmer looks for work as a mail carrier. Joyce resents the intrusion of the ill-mannered Truffles, and Polly concurs with her when the meddlesome Marie damages the beauty parlor and her children scratch her car.

One evening, while Joyce is out on a date with her playboy sweetheart, Johnnie Beasley, Marie and Polly compare their daughters' boyfriends. Polly boasts that Johnnie is the better because he is a sophisticated millionaire, while Marie informs Polly that Tommy Haverly, Vivian's boyfriend, is from one of the oldest families in South Bend. Polly then insults Marie when she tells her that Vivian will never meet the same caliber of men that Joyce meets. When Johnnie brings Joyce home, he meets Vivian and takes an immediate liking to her, which makes Joyce jealous. The next day, after spurning Tommy, Vivian goes on a lunch date with Johnnie. Joyce later accuses Vivian of trying to steal her boyfriend. At the salon, Marie makes a nuisance of herself when, after a series of errors, she accidentally locks Polly in the steam room. Later, Polly and Marie become embroiled in their daughters' quarrel over Johnnie, and Marie strikes Joyce when Joyce insults Vivian.

Three months pass, and the Truffles, now settled into their own home, await the arrival of Johnnie, who has been dating Vivian and will be escorting her to a party. While Vivian and Johnnie are out on their date, the heartbroken Joyce visits Marie and begs her to intervene in her daughter's affair with the man she loves. Moved by her show of emotion, Marie agrees to help Joyce by going to Johnnie's and speaking to him on her behalf. At Johnnie's, Marie accuses the young playboy of unfairly turning Vivian's head with fancy cars, yachts and other luxuries and then giving her the gate. Marie then insists that Johnnie marry Joyce, which he agrees to do. Marie tells her daughter that Johnnie was not worthy of her love because he was only seeing her to make Joyce jealous. After Joyce and Johnnie's wedding, Polly, unaware that Marie was responsible for their reunion, calls to gloat about the news and remind Marie that Vivian should have "stayed in her own class." However, when Joyce explains Marie's involvement, Polly thanks her sister for her help, and the two forgive each other.

Cast
Marie Dressler as Marie Truffle
Polly Moran as Polly Rochay
Anita Page as Vivian Truffle
Lucien Littlefield	as Elmer Truffle
William Collier, Jr. as Johnnie Beasley 
Sally Eilers as Joyce Rochay
William Bakewell as Tommy Haverly
Billy Naylor as Jerry Truffle
Jay Ward as Marty Truffle

References

External links
 

1931 films
American comedy films
1931 comedy films
Metro-Goldwyn-Mayer films
Films directed by Charles Reisner
American black-and-white films
1930s English-language films
1930s American films